Khrushchev dough was the result of introducing flour rationing in the Soviet Union after a crop failure, which led to the food irregularities in 1963, under Nikita Khrushchev. Products made from the Khrushchev dough were called Khrushchev loaves or Khrushchev pies. The Khrushchev pie was made by extracting the pulp out of a loaf of wheat bread, injecting filling, and baking in an oven. In 1963–1964, that pie became common on New Year tables. The color of the Khrushchev loaves in Leningrad was nearly blue. In some recipes from Runet, the dough was supposed to be long-lasting.

See also
 Mikoyan cutlet

Notes

Soviet cuisine
Soviet phraseology
Second economy of the Soviet Union
1960s in the Soviet Union
Nikita Khrushchev
Breads
Doughs